Crazy Boy is a 2016 Kannada-language romance film. The movie stars Dilip Prakash in lead role and Ashika, making her debut as the female lead in the film. Directed by Kannada movie director Mahesh Babu the movie released on 18 August 2016.

This movie also dubbed in Gujarati language as Pahelo Divas (પહેલો દિવસ).

Plot 
Arjun is a passionate and family guy, raised by his father's friend, a mechanic, after the death of his parents in a car accident. Nandini is a rich college girl, who soon falls for his good nature. Arjun also contested to become a college leader, which earns the wrath of Vikki, a high profile brat, but soon ends the rivalry and they become friends. However, their love life doesn't go smoothly after an incident where Arjun's father gets insulted by Nandini's brother intentionally as he doesn't accept their relationship. Later, Nandini is introduced to her would-be-groom, a rich businessman, by Nandini's brother. However, at a stage play, Arjun and Nandini get cleared of their misunderstanding and they reunite. In a fit of rage, the businessman tries to kill Nandini, but is captured by police, who reveals that he is actually a fraud, running a gang of human traffickers. Nandini's brother realize his mistake and accepts their relationship.

Cast 
Dilip Prakash as Arjun
Ashika Ranganath as Nandini
P. Ravi Shankar as Nandini's brother
Rangayana Raghu as Arjun's adopted father (Arjun's father's friend)
Sadhu Kokila as a drama teacher
Ananth Nag

Soundtrack 

The movie music is composed by music director Jassie Gift. The soundtrack album rights is acquired by Akash Audio. Darshan and Santhanam jointly released audio CD of Kannada cinema ‘Crazy Boy’ of debut producer G Chandru in Durgaparameshwari Amma Films.

Track listing

References

External links 
 
 

2016 films
2010s teen romance films
2010s Kannada-language films
Indian teen romance films
Films set in universities and colleges
Films shot in Bangalore
Films shot in Thailand
Films directed by Mahesh Babu (director)